In mathematics, especially in the fields of group cohomology, homological algebra and number theory, the Lyndon spectral sequence or Hochschild–Serre spectral sequence is a spectral sequence relating the group cohomology of a normal subgroup N and the quotient group G/N to the cohomology of the total group G.  The spectral sequence is named after Roger Lyndon, Gerhard Hochschild, and Jean-Pierre Serre.

Statement
Let  be a group and  be a normal subgroup. The latter ensures that the quotient  is a group, as well. Finally, let  be a -module. Then there is a spectral sequence of cohomological type

and there is a spectral sequence of homological type

,
where the arrow '' means convergence of spectral sequences.

The same statement holds if  is a profinite group,  is a closed normal subgroup and  denotes the continuous cohomology.

Examples

Homology of the Heisenberg group 

The spectral sequence can be used to compute the homology of the Heisenberg group G with integral entries, i.e., matrices of the form

This group is a central extension

with center  corresponding to the subgroup with a=c=0. The spectral sequence for the group homology, together with the analysis of a differential in this spectral sequence, shows that

Cohomology of wreath products 

For a group G, the wreath product is an extension

The resulting spectral sequence of group cohomology with coefficients in a field k,

is known to degenerate at the -page.

Properties
The associated five-term exact sequence is the usual inflation-restriction exact sequence:

Generalizations
The spectral sequence is an instance of the more general Grothendieck spectral sequence of the composition of two derived functors.

A similar spectral sequence exists for group homology, as opposed to group cohomology, as well.

References

  (paywalled)
 
 

Spectral sequences
Group theory